The Basilica of Our Mother of Mercy is a Franciscan church in Maribor, Slovenia.

External links

Roman Catholic churches in Maribor
Mother of Mercy, Maribor
Romanesque Revival architecture in Slovenia
Romanesque Revival church buildings
Roman Catholic churches completed in 1900
19th-century Roman Catholic church buildings in Slovenia